Pushpa: The Rise is the soundtrack album composed by Devi Sri Prasad to the 80 Indian Telugu-language action drama film of the same name, directed by Sukumar, starring Allu Arjun, Rashmika Mandanna, and Fahadh Faasil. The soundtrack features five tracks written by Chandrabose.

Production 
The music production of the film began in mid 2020 and in a Zoom video interaction, Prasad revealed that five songs were finalized for the film and had started composing the tunes during the nationwide lockdown due to COVID-19. By the end of May 2021, Devi has recorded composition of an item number which has folk music influences. Ganesh Acharya has choreographed the dance moves in the first song "Daako Daako Meka" and "Oo Antava..Oo Oo Antava". On 26 February 2021, Jani Master announced that he has choreographed a song from the film. Earlier Nora Fatehi was confirmed to feature alongside Allu Arjun in an item number in September 2021. The song, which was later released as "Oo Antava..Oo Oo Antava", was reported to be choreographed by Sekhar. Finally in November 2021, Samantha Ruth Prabhu was announced to be part of the item number alongside Allu Arjun, and was choreographed by Ganesh Acharya. The song was shot at Ramoji Film City at the end of November 2021.

Release 
On 2 August 2021, coinciding with Prasad's birthday, the team announced that the first single from the film will be released on 13 August 2021 in all the five languages. The second single "Srivalli" was released on 13 October 2021. It was a huge success and debuted atop the Billboard India charts. The third single "Saami Saami" was released on 28 October 2021 in all languages excluding Hindi, due to few issues regarding distribution rights of the Hindi version. The fourth single of the soundtrack album "Eyy Bidda Idhi Naa Adda" (in Telugu), "Eyy Beta Idhu En Patta" (in Tamil), "Eyy Poda Ithu Njaanaada" (in Malayalam), "Eyy Maga Idhu Nan Jaaga" (in Kannada) and "Eyy Bidda Ye Mera Adda" (in Hindi) was released on 19 November 2021. The last single, an item number, "Oo Antava Oo Oo Antava" (in Telugu), "Oo Solriya Oo Oo Solriya" (in Tamil), "Oo Chollunno Oo Oo Chollunno" (in Malayalam), "Oo Anthiya Oo Oo Anthiya" (in Kannada) and "Oo Bolega Ya Oo Oo Bolega" (in Hindi) was released on 10 December 2021. In 6 April 2022 This Song was also remade in Bhojpuri 'Aaj bhar dhil da dhodhi jan chhil da' by local singer Bullet Raja became Blockbuster it was India 54th Ranked Top Music on Youtube.

Track listing

Background score 
The background score is arranged and composed by Devi Sri Prasad.

Notes

References 

2021 soundtrack albums
Telugu film soundtracks
Devi Sri Prasad soundtracks
Aditya Music soundtracks
Action film soundtracks
Thriller film soundtracks
Hindi film soundtracks